Vancouver Whitecaps may reference one of the following soccer clubs:

Vancouver Whitecaps (1974–1984), a former member of the now-defunct North American Soccer League
Vancouver Whitecaps (1986–2010), a former member of the Canadian Soccer League, the United Soccer Leagues First Division and the USSF Division 2
Vancouver Whitecaps FC (2011– ), the present Whitecaps team that has played in MLS since 2011
Whitecaps FC 2 (2015–2017), a reserve club that played in the United Soccer League.
Vancouver Whitecaps FC U-23 (2005–2014), reserve club that played in the USL Premier Development League
Whitecaps FC Academy, academy division of the club
Vancouver Whitecaps FC (women) (2003–2012), a member of the United Soccer Leagues W-League